Claris Organizer is a personal information management (PIM) computer program for the classic Mac OS that Claris acquired from a small company called Trio Development and sold during the 1990s. Trio Development was founded by James Harker, Jack Welde and Joseph Ansanelli, afterward joined by Seth Odam.  It was sold to Palm when Claris was broken up, and was used as the basis for the Palm Desktop for Mac.

References
The previous link <http://www.ansanelli.com > is no longer available.

External links
 Review upon initial release August 1994
 Review of the first release at macuser.com September 1996

Classic Mac OS software
Personal information managers